The following is an episode list for the Japanese television series Dotch Cooking Show.

Dotch Cooking Show

1997 - 2005

New Dotch Cooking Show

Specials

Notes

External links
 New Dotch Cooking Show official episode list
 Dotch Cooking Show Returns 2007 results page
 Dotch!? DataWeb, a fansite and collection of Dotch statistics

Dotch Cooking Show